Elizabeth Steventon was a former female international table tennis player from England.

Table tennis career
She was a member of the English winning team in the 1948 World Table Tennis Championships known as the Corbillon Cup.

See also
 List of England players at the World Team Table Tennis Championships
 List of table tennis players
 List of World Table Tennis Championships medalists

References

English female table tennis players
1912 births
Year of death missing
World Table Tennis Championships medalists